The 2008–09 North Dakota State Bison men's basketball team represented North Dakota State University. The head coach was Saul Phillips. The team played its home games in the Bison Sports Arena in Fargo, North Dakota, and was a member of the Summit League. They received an automatic berth to the NCAA tournament after winning The Summit League men's basketball tournament in their first year of eligibility, the first team to do so since Long Beach State in 1970.

References

North Dakota State
North Dakota State Bison men's basketball seasons
North Dakota State
2008 in sports in North Dakota
2009 in sports in North Dakota